The Bermuda Rugby Football Union is the rugby governing body in Bermuda. It was founded in 1964, and joined the International Rugby Board in 1992. The federation oversees the Bermuda national rugby union team.

See also
Sport in Bermuda

External links
Bermuda Rugby Football Union
Bermuda on irb.com

References

Rugby union in Bermuda
Bermuda
Rugby
Sports organizations established in 1964
1964 establishments in Bermuda